Marvin Arthur Wolfman (born May 13, 1946) is an American comic book and novelization writer. He worked on Marvel Comics's The Tomb of Dracula, for which he and artist Gene Colan created the vampire-slayer Blade, and DC Comics's The New Teen Titans and the Crisis on Infinite Earths limited series with George Pérez. Among the many characters Wolfman created or co-created are Cyborg, Raven, Starfire, Deathstroke, Tim Drake, Rose Wilson, Nova, Black Cat, Bullseye, Vigilante (Adrian Chase) and the Omega Men.

Early life
Marv Wolfman was born in Brooklyn, New York City, the son of police officer Abe and housewife Fay. He has a sister, Harriet, 12 years older. When Wolfman was 13, his family moved to Flushing, Queens, in New York City, where he attended junior high school. He went on to New York's High School of Art and Design, in Manhattan, hoping to become a cartoonist. Wolfman is Jewish.

Career

1960s
Marvin Wolfman was active in fandom before he began his professional comics career at DC Comics in 1968. Wolfman was one of the first to publish Stephen King, with "In A Half-World of Terror" in Wolfman's horror fanzine Stories of Suspense No. 2 (1965). This was a revised version of King's first published story, "I Was a Teenage Grave Robber", which had been serialized over four issues (three published and one unpublished) of the fanzine Comics Review that same year.<ref>{{cite book| last=Wood | first=Rocky|title=Stephen King: Uncollected, Unpublished | publisher= Cemetery Dance Publications| location=Abingdon, Maryland |year=2006| page=199|isbn= 1-58767-130-1|display-authors=etal}}</ref>

Wolfman's first published work for DC Comics appeared in Blackhawk No. 242 (Aug.–Sept. 1968). He and longtime friend Len Wein created the character Jonny Double in Showcase No. 78 (November 1968) scripted by Wolfman. The two co-wrote "Eye of the Beholder" in Teen Titans No. 18 (Dec. 1968), which would be Wein's first professional comics credit. Neal Adams was called upon to rewrite and redraw a Teen Titans story which had been written by Wein and Wolfman. The story, titled "Titans Fit the Battle of Jericho!", would have introduced DC's first African American superhero, but was rejected by publisher Carmine Infantino. The revised story appeared in Teen Titans No. 20 (March–April 1969). Wolfman and Gil Kane created an origin for Wonder Girl in Teen Titans No. 22 (July–Aug. 1969) which introduced the character's new costume.

1970s
He and artist Bernie Wrightson co-created Destiny in Weird Mystery Tales No. 1 (July–Aug. 1972), a character which would later be used in the work of Neil Gaiman.

In 1972, Wolfman moved to Marvel Comics as a protégé of then-editor Roy Thomas. When Thomas stepped down, Wolfman eventually took over as editor, initially in charge of the publisher's black-and-white magazines, then finally the color line of comics. Wolfman said in 1981 that, "Marvel never gave [its] full commitment to" the black-and-white line. "No one wanted to commit themselves to the staff." He added, "We used to farm the books out to Harry Chester Studios [sic] and whatever they pasted up, they pasted up. I formed the first production staff, hired the first layout people, paste-up people." Wolfman stepped down as editor-in-chief to spend more time writing.

He and artist Gene Colan crafted The Tomb of Dracula, a horror comic that became "one of the most acclaimed horror-themed comic books ever". During their run on this series, they created Blade, a character who would later be portrayed by actor Wesley Snipes in a film trilogy. In addition, the editorship of Marvel could not resist the opportunity to assign a writer with such a surname to contribute a few stories to their concurrent monster title, Werewolf by Night, with a playful editor's comment: "At last -- WEREWOLF -- written by a WOLFMAN."

Wolfman co-created Bullseye in Daredevil No. 131 (March 1976).Sanderson "1970s" in Gilbert (2008), p. 175 "In March [1976], writer Marv Wolfman and artist Bob Brown co-created one of the Man Without Fear's greatest nemeses, Bullseye." He and artist John Buscema created Nova in that character's eponymous first issue.
Wolfman and Gil Kane adapted Edgar Rice Burroughs' Barsoom concepts into comics in Marvel's John Carter, Warlord of Mars series. Wolfman wrote 14 issues of Marvel Two-in-One starting with issue No. 25 (March 1977). The Spider-Woman series was launched in April 1978 by Wolfman and artist Carmine Infantino. As the first regular writer on Spider-Woman, he redesigned the character, giving her a human identity as Jessica Drew. Wolfman succeeded Len Wein as writer of The Amazing Spider-Man and in his first issue, No. 182 (July 1978), had Peter Parker propose marriage to Mary Jane Watson who refused, in the following issue. Wolfman and Keith Pollard introduced the likable rogue the Black Cat (Felicia Hardy) in The Amazing Spider-Man No. 194 (July 1979).

In 1978, Wolfman and artist Alan Kupperberg took over the Howard the Duck syndicated newspaper comic strip. While writing the Fantastic Four (which Wolfman stated to be his favorite comic), Wolfman and John Byrne introduced a new herald for Galactus named Terrax in No. 211 (Oct. 1979). A Godzilla story by Wolfman and Steve Ditko was changed into a Dragon Lord story published in Marvel Spotlight vol. 2 No. 5 (March 1980). The creature that the Dragon Lord battled was intended to be Godzilla but since Marvel no longer had the rights to the character (which lapsed the previous year) the creature was modified to a dragon called The Wani.

1980s

The New Teen Titans
In 1980, Wolfman returned to DC after a dispute with Marvel. Teaming with penciller George Pérez, Wolfman relaunched DC's Teen Titans in a special preview in DC Comics Presents No. 26 (October 1980). The New Teen Titans added the Wolfman-Pérez creations Raven, Starfire and Cyborg to the old team's Robin, Wonder Girl, Kid Flash, and Beast Boy (renamed Changeling). The series became DC's first new hit in years; Christopher J. Priest called Deathstroke, another new character, "the first modern supervillain". Wolfman wrote a series of New Teen Titans drug awareness comic books which were published in cooperation with The President's Drug Awareness Campaign in 1983–1984. The first was pencilled by Pérez and sponsored by the Keebler Company, the second was illustrated by Ross Andru and underwritten by the American Soft Drink Industry, and the third was drawn by Adrian Gonzales and financed by IBM. In August 1984, a second series of The New Teen Titans was launched by Wolfman and Pérez.

Other projects by Wolfman for DC during the early 1980s included collaborating with artist Gil Kane on a run on the Superman feature in Action Comics; a revival of Dial H for HeroManning "1980s" in Dolan, p. 192 Legion of Super-Heroes No. 272 "Within a sixteen-page preview in Legion of Super-Heroes #272...was "Dial 'H' For Hero," a new feature that raised the bar on fan interaction in the creative process. The feature's story, written by Marv Wolfman, with art by Carmine Infantino, saw two high-school students find dials that turned them into super-heroes. Everything from the pair's civilian clothes to the heroes they became was created by fans writing in. his concept would continue in the feature's new regular spot within Adventure Comics." with Carmine Infantino; launching Night Force, a supernatural series drawn by Gene Colan; and a nearly two-year run on Green Lantern with Joe Staton. During their collaboration on that series, Wolfman and Staton created the Omega Men in Green Lantern No. 141 (June 1981). Wolfman briefly wrote Batman and co-created the Electrocutioner in issue No. 331 (Jan. 1981). Wolfman was one of the contributors to the DC Challenge limited series in 1986.

After Pérez left The New Teen Titans in 1985, Wolfman continued for many years with other collaborators – including pencillers José Luis García-López, Eduardo Barreto and Tom Grummett. In December 1986, Wolfman was informed by Marvel writer Chris Claremont that a DC executive had approached Claremont at a holiday party and offered him the position of writer on The New Teen Titans. Claremont immediately declined the offer and told Wolfman that apparently the publisher was looking to replace him on the title. When Wolfman confronted DC executives about this, he was told it was "just a joke", although Claremont reiterated that he took it to be a credible and official offer.

Crisis on Infinite Earths
In 1985, Wolfman and Pérez launched Crisis on Infinite Earths, a 12-issue limited series celebrating DC's 50th anniversary. Featuring a cast of thousands and a timeline that ranged from the beginning of the universe to the end of time, it killed scores of characters, integrated a number of heroes from other companies to DC continuity, and re-wrote 50 years of DC universe history to streamline it. After finishing Crisis, Wolfman and Pérez produced the History of the DC Universe limited series to summarize the company's new history.

Wolfman was involved in the relaunch of the Superman line as well, reinventing nemesis Lex Luthor and initially scripting the Adventures of Superman title with Jerry Ordway as the artist. During this period they introduced Bibbo Bibbowski and Professor Emil Hamilton.

Ratings dispute
Wolfman got into a public dispute with DC over a proposed ratings system, which led to his being relieved of his editorial duties by the company. DC offered to reinstate Wolfman as an editor provided he apologize for making his criticism of the ratings system public, rather than keeping them internal to the company, but he declined to do so.

1990s
Wolfman returned to the Dark Knight for another brief run on Batman and Detective Comics, writing "Batman: Year Three", creating Robin III Tim Drake as well as Abattoir and a new version of the Electrocutioner, and writing an anniversary adaptation of the first ever Batman story, which was printed along with two other adaptations and the original. He continued as The New Titans writer and revitalized the series with artist Tom Grummett. Wolfman wrote the series until the title's last issue. Wolfman's writing for comics decreased as he turned to animation and television, though he wrote the mid-1990s DC series The Man Called A-X.

Disney career
In the early-1990s, Wolfman worked at Disney Comics. He wrote scripts for a seven part DuckTales story ("Scrooge's Quest"), as well as several others – with the characters from the Mickey Mouse universe – that appeared in Mickey Mouse Adventures. He was editor of the comics section on the Disney Adventures magazine for the early years of the publication.

Marvel lawsuit
In 1997, on the eve of the impending release of the Blade motion picture, Wolfman sued Marvel Characters Inc. over ownership of all characters he had created for Marvel Comics. A ruling in Marvel's favor was handed down on November 6, 2000. Wolfman's stance was that he had not signed work-for-hire contracts when he created characters including Blade and Nova. In a nonjury trial, the judge ruled that Marvel's later use of the characters was sufficiently different to protect it from Wolfman's claim of copyright ownership.

Beast Machines
In the late 1990s, Wolfman developed the Transformers TV series Beast Machines, which aired on Fox Kids for two seasons from 1999 to 2000. The program was a direct continuation of the Beast Wars series, which itself was a continuation of the original Generation One Transformers show. Beast Machines was met with mixed reviews, as the show was praised for its story, but was criticized for its focus on spirituality. Previously, in the 1980s, Wolfman wrote the story for Optimus Prime's return in "The Return of Optimus Prime" of the third season of Transformers.

2000s
A decade later, Wolfman began writing in comics again, scripting Defex, the flagship title of Devil's Due Productions' Aftermath line. He wrote an "Infinite Crisis" issue of DC's "Secret Files", and consulted with writer Geoff Johns on several issues of The Teen Titans. Wolfman wrote a novel based on Crisis on Infinite Earths, but rather than following the original plot, he created a new story starring the Barry Allen Flash that takes place during the original Crisis story. Wolfman wrote the novelization of the film Superman Returns, and worked on a direct-to-video animated film, The Condor, for Stan Lee's Pow Entertainment.

In 2006, Wolfman was editorial director of Impact Comics (no relation to the DC Comics imprint), publisher of educational manga-style comics for high school students. That same year, starting with issue No. 125, Wolfman began writing DC's Nightwing series. Initially scheduled for a four-issue run, Wolfman's run was expanded to 13 issues, and finished with No. 137. During the course of his run, Wolfman introduced a new Vigilante character. Following Wolfman's departure from the pages of Nightwing, the Vigilante was spun off into his own short-lived title, which Wolfman wrote. He wrote a miniseries starring the Teen Titan Raven, a character he and George Pérez co-created during their run on The New Teen Titans, helping to revamp and update the character. He worked with Pérez on a direct-to-DVD movie adaptation of the popular "Judas Contract" storyline from their tenure on Teen Titans.

2010s
In 2011, he and Pérez completed the New Teen Titans: Games graphic novel, which they had begun working on in the late 1980s. Wolfman revived his Night Force series with artist Tom Mandrake in 2012. He served as writing consultant on the video game Epic Mickey 2: The Power of Two, which he was nominated for a Writers Guild of America Award for Outstanding Achievement in Videogame Writing. In 2015, Wolfman wrote a novelization of the videogame Batman: Arkham Knight.
And in 2016 he published the novelization of the Suicide Squad film through Titan Books. He received the Hero Initiative Lifetime Achievement Award in 2017. That year also marked Wolfman's first work for Marvel since 1998: a backup story for Bullseye #1, starring the titular character that he had co-created in 1976. In 2019, DC published the oversized, 100-page comic book Man and Superman, Marv Wolfman's retelling of Superman's origin story, to high acclaim.

Writing credit pioneer
Wolfman, on the panel "Marvel Comics: The Method and the Madness" at the 1974 New York City Comic Art Convention, told the audience that when he first began working for DC Comics, he received DC's first writing credit on its mystery magazines. Gerry Conway, who wrote the horror-host interstitial pages between stories, wrote in one issue, House of Secrets Vol. 1 Issue 83, that the following story, "The Stuff that Dreams are Made of" was told to him by a "wandering Wolfman." The Comics Code Authority, which did not permit the mention of werewolves or wolfmen at that time, demanded it be removed. DC informed the Authority that "Wolfman" was the writer's last name, so the Authority insisted he be given a credit to show the "Wolfman" was a real person. Once Wolfman was given a credit, other writers demanded them as well. Shortly, credits were given to all writers and artists.

Personal life
Wolfman is married to Noel Watkins. Wolfman was previously married to Michele Wolfman, for many years a colorist in the comics industry. They have a daughter, Jessica Morgan.

Awards
 Inkpot Award in 1979.
 1982 Eagle Award for "Best New Book" and 1984 and 1985 Eagle Awards for "Best Group Book" for New Teen Titans. Wolfman and artist George Pérez' Crisis on Infinite Earths won the 1985 and 1986 Jack Kirby Awards for Best Finite Series.
 In 1985, DC Comics named Wolfman as one of the honorees in the company's 50th anniversary publication Fifty Who Made DC Great.
 1986 Nominated for the Comics Buyer's Guide Award for Favorite Writer in 1986, and his work on the "Batman: Year Three" story arc in Batman #436–439 was nominated Comics Buyer's Guide Favorite Writer Award in 1990.
 2007 Scribe Award for "Adapted Speculative Fiction Novel", given by writers of novelization and tie-in fiction for his novel based on Superman Returns.
 2007 National Jewish Book Award for "Children's and Young Adult Literature", for Homeland: The Illustrated History of the State of Israel 2011 induction into the Will Eisner Hall of Fame
Hero Initiative Lifetime Achievement Award in 2017

Filmography

Screenwriting credits
(series head writer denoted in bold)G.I. Joe: A Real American Hero (1986)Jem (1986–1987)Captain Power and the Soldiers of the Future (1987)Fraggle Rock: The Animated Series (1987)Starcom: The U.S. Space Force (1987)The Transformers (1987) (season 3 head writer)Garbage Pail Kids (1988)RoboCop (1988)Superman (1988)G.I. Joe: A Real American Hero (1991)Batman: The Animated Series (1992)My Little Pony Tales (1992)Cadillacs and Dinosaurs (1993)Conan the Adventurer (1993)Monster Force (1994)Spider-Man: The Animated Series (1995)Tenko and the Guardians of the Magic (1995)Beast Wars: Transformers (1996)G.I. Joe Extreme (1996)Street Fighter (1996)
 ReBoot (1997–1999)Pocket Dragon Adventures (1998)Godzilla: The Series (1998)Shadow Raiders (1998–1999)Beast Machines: Transformers (1999)Sherlock Holmes in the 22nd Century (1999)The Legend of Tarzan (2001)Teen Titans (2003, 2005)Speed Racer: The Next Generation (2008)Sym-Bionic Titan (2010)Arrow (2020)

Video games
 Superman Returns (2006)

Acting credits

Bibliography

Bongo Comics
 Treehouse of Horror #11 (2005)

Chaos Comics
 The Mummy: Valley of the Gods #1 (2001)

Dark Horse Comics
 The Curse of Dracula #1–3 (1998)
 Michael Chabon Presents the Amazing Adventures of the Escapist #3 (2004)

DC Comics

 9–11: The World's Finest Comic Book Writers & Artists Tell Stories to Remember, Volume Two (2002)
 Action Comics #513–516, 525–536, 539–546, 551–554, 556, 613–618, 627–628, 778, 1000 (1980–2018)
 Adventure Comics #417, 421, 424, 474, 479–487 (1972–1981)
 Adventures of Superman #424–435, 591 (1987–2001)
 Aquaman Giant #1 (2019)
 Batman #328–335, 436–451 (1980–1990)
 Batman and the Outsiders #5 (1983)
 Batman Black and White vol. 2 #3 (2014)
 The Best of DC #18 (New Teen Titans) (1981)
 Blackhawk #242 (1968)
 The Brave and the Bold #167 (1980)
 The Brave and the Bold vol. 3 #17–18 (2008)
 Convergence: Adventures of Superman #1–2 (2015)
 Convergence: New Teen Titans #1–2 (2015)
 Crisis on Infinite Earths #1–12 (1985–1986)
 Crisis on Infinite Earths Giant #1–2 (with Marc Guggenheim) (2019)
 Cyborg #10–12, 21–23 (2016–2018)
 DC Challenge #11–12 (1986)
 DC Comics Presents No. 26, 77–78 Annual #1 (1980–1985)
 DC Comics Presents: Justice League of America #1 (2004)
 DC Primal Age #1 (2019)
 DC Retroactive: Superman – The '80s #1 (2011)
 DC Special: Raven #1–5 (2008)
 DC: The Doomned and the Damned #1 (2020)
 DC Universe Online: Legends #1, 3, 5, 7, 9–11, 13, 15, 18–26 (2011–2012)
 Deathstroke the Terminator/Deathstroke the Hunted/Deathstroke #1–11, 13–21, 26–39, 41–60, 0, Annual #1, 3–4 (1991–1996)
 Detective Comics No. 408, 615, 625–628, 1027 (1971, 1990–1991, 2020)
 Eight Legged Freaks #1 (2002)
 Flash #750 (2020)
 Green Lantern vol. 2 #133–153 (1980–1982)
 Green Lantern 80-Page Giant #2 (1999)
 Green Lantern/Plastic Man: Weapons of Mass Deception #1 (2011)
 History of the DC Universe #1–2 (1987)
 House of Mystery #176, 179–180, 182–183, 300 (1968–1982)
 House of Secrets #82–84, 87–88, 90, 127 (1969–1975)
 Infinite Crisis Secret Files and Origins #1 (2006)
 Legends of the DC Universe #18 (1999)
 Legends of the DC Universe 80-Page Giant #1 (1998)
 Legends of the DC Universe: Crisis on Infinite Earths #1 (1999)
 Legion of Super-Heroes vol. 2 #272 (1981)
 Looney Tunes #218 (2014)
 Man and Superman #1 (2019)
 Man Called A-X vol. 2 #1–8 (1997–1998)
 Mystery in Space #116 (1981)
 The New Teen Titans #1–40, Annual #1–2 (1980–1984)
 The New Teen Titans vol. 2 #1–49, Annual #1–4 (1984–1988)
 The New Teen Titans Drug Awareness Special #1–3 (1983)
 The New Teen Titans: Games GN (2011)
 The New Titans #50–86, 88–93, 97–130, #0, Annual #5–11 (1988–1995)
 Night Force #1–14 (1982–1983)
 Night Force vol. 2 #1–12 (1996–1997)
 Night Force vol. 3 #1–7 (2012)
 Nightwing vol. 2 #125–137 (2006–2007)
 Omega Men #24 (1985)
 Phantom Stranger vol. 2 #23–26 (1973)
 Plop! #14 (1975)
 Raven #1–6 (2016–2017)
 Raven: Daughter of Darkness #1–12 (2018–2019)
 Robin 80th Anniversary 100-Page Super Spectacular #1 (2020)
 Secret Origins vol. 2 #46 (1989)
 Secret Origins vol. 3 #5 (2014)
 Showcase #78 (1968)
 Showcase '94 #11 (1994)
 Silver Age: Teen Titans #1 (2000)
 Spirit #4 (2010)
 Superboy vol. 5 #26–29 (2014)
 Supergirl #1–2 (1972–1973)
 Superman #248, 352, 422 (1972–1986)
 Superman vol. 2 #169 (2001)
 The Superman Family #203–206, 209 (1980–1981)
 Superman: Kal-El Returns Special #1 (2022)
 Superman: Our Worlds at War Secret Files and Origins #1 (2001)
 Superman: The Man of Steel #113 (2001)
 Tales of the New Teen Titans #1–4 (1982)
 Tales of the Teen Titans #41–58, Annual #3 (1984–1985)
 Tarzan #207–209, 213–216 (1972–1973)
 Team Titans #1–12, Annual #1 (1992–1993)
 Teen Titans #18, 22 (1968–1969)
 Teen Titans vol. 3 #33, 50, Annual #1 (2006–2007)
 Teen Titans vol. 4 #23.1 (Trigon) (2013)
 Teen Titans vol. 6 #16 (2018)
 Teen Titans Spotlight #1–6 (1986–1987)
 Titans #25 (2001)
 Titans Secret Files and Origins #1 (1999)
 Titans Sell-Out Special #1 (1992)
 Vigilante #1–15, 19–20 (1983–1985)
 Vigilante vol. 3 #1–12 (2009–2010)
 Weird War Tales #3, 6 (1972)
 Weird Worlds #1–7 (1972–1973)
 The Witching Hour #13 (1971)
 Wonder Woman #287, 294 (1982)
 Wonder Woman: Agent of Peace #10 (digital) (2020)
 World's Finest Comics #288, 300 (1983–1984)

WildStorm
 Farscape: War Torn #1–2 (2002)
 God of War #1–6 (2010–2011)
 Robo Dojo #1–6 (2002)
 The X-Files vol. 2 #3–4 (2009)

Devil's Due Publications
 Defex #1–6 (2004–2005)

Disney Comics
 Disney Adventures Digest Special Edition (1990)
 Goofy Adventures #17 (1991)
 Mickey Mouse Adventures #5, 9, 11, 14 (1990–1991)

Eclipse Comics
 Total Eclipse (1988)

First Comics
 Sable #1–7, 9–10, 12–23 (1988–1990)

Gladstone Publishing
 Duck Tales ("Scrooge's Quest") (1990)

IDW Publishing
 Gene Pool OGN (with Len Wein) (2003)

Image Comics
 10th Muse #1–9 (2000–2002)
 Brigade #17–22 (1995)

Malibu Comics
 Codename: Firearm #0, 2, 4–5 (1995)
 Man Called A-X #1–4, #0 (1994–1995)
 Ultraforce #8–9 (1995)
 Ultraforce/Spider-Man #1A-B (1996)
 Witch #1 (1989)

Marvel Comics

 Amazing Adventures #20 (1973)
 The Amazing Spider-Man #182–204, Annual #13 (1978–1980)
 Avengers #169 (1978)
 Bullseye #1 (2017)
 Captain America #192 (1975)
 Captain Marvel #23 (1972)
 Crazy Magazine #2, 11 (1974–1975)
 Daredevil #125–139, 141–143, Annual #4 (1975–1977)
 Doctor Strange #19–20, 22–23, Annual #1 (1976–1977)
 Dracula Lives #2–5 (1973–1974)
 Fantastic Four #190, 195–215, Annual #12, 14 (1978–1980)
 Ghost Rider #20 (1976)
 Giant-Size Chillers Featuring Curse of Dracula #1 (1974)
 Giant-Size Fantastic Four #3 (1974)
 Giant-Size Man-Thing #5 (1975)
 Howard the Duck #28 (1978)
 John Carter, Warlord of Mars #1–15, Annual #1, 3 (1977–1979)
 Journey into Mystery #520–521 (1998)
 Legion of Monsters #1 (1975)
 Machine Man #10–14 (1979–1980)
 Marvel Comics Presents #38–47 (1989–1990)
 Marvel Fanfare #16–17 (1984)
 Marvel Movie Premiere #1 (The Land That Time Forgot adaptation) (1975)
 Marvel Premiere #39–40 (1977–1978)
 Marvel Preview #1, 8, 16 (1975–1978)
 Marvel Spotlight vol. 2 #5 (1980)
 Marvel Super Special #15 (Star Trek: The Motion Picture adaptation) (1979)
 Marvel Team-Up #98 (1980)
 Marvel Team-Up vol. 2 #7 (1998)
 Marvel Two-in-One #13, 25–37, 44, 59, Annual #3 (1976–1980)
 Mission Impossible #1 (1996)
 Monsters Unleashed #1 (1973)
 Nova #1–25 (1976–1979)
 Power Man #37–46 (1976–1977)
 Shadows & Light #2 (1998)
 Skull the Slayer #1–3 (1975–1976)
 The Spectacular Spider-Man #44 (1980)
 Spider-Woman #1–8 (1978)
 Spoof #2–5 (1972–1973)
 Star Trek #4 (1980)
 Sub-Mariner #70–71 (1974)
 Tales of the Zombie #1 (1973)
 The Tomb of Dracula #7–70 (1973–1979)
 The Tomb of Dracula vol. 2 #1–3 (1979–1980)
 Tower of Shadows #4 (1970)
 Two-Gun Kid #104 (1972)
 Vampire Tales #8–9 (1974–1975)
 Venom: Sinner Takes All #5 (1995)
 Werewolf by Night #11–15 (1973–1974)
 What If...? #5 (1979)

Epic Comics
 The Tomb of Dracula vol. 3 #1–4 (1991–1992)

Moonstone
 Captain Action Comics #2–3 (with Fabian Nicieza) (2009)

Nachshon Press
 Homeland OGN (2007)

Now Comics
 Mirror Walker #1 (1989)

Renaissance Press
 The Forbidden Book Vol. 1 (2001)

S.Q.P. Inc.
 Phase #1 (1971)

Skywald Publications
 Nightmare #2 (1971)
 Psycho #2 (1971)

TSR, Inc.
 R.I.P. #1–2, 4 (1990)

Zenescope
 Mankind: The Story of All of Us'' Vol. 1 (2012)

References

Further reading

External links
 
 
 "DC Profiles #69: Marv Wolfman" at the Grand Comics Database
 Marv Wolfman at Mike's Amazing World of Comics
 Marv Wolfman at the Unofficial Handbook of Marvel Comics Creators
 Interview at Fantastic Four Headquarters
 Interview with ComicsVerse

1946 births
American comics writers
American male screenwriters
Comic book editors
DC Comics people
High School of Art and Design alumni
Inkpot Award winners
Jewish American artists
Jewish American writers
Living people
Marvel Comics editors-in-chief
Marvel Comics writers
Writers from Brooklyn